Burntwood is a former mining town and civil parish in the Lichfield District in Staffordshire, England, approximately  west of Lichfield and north east of Brownhills.  The town had a population of 26,049 and forms part of Lichfield district. The town forms one of the largest urbanised parishes in England. Samuel Johnson opened an academy in nearby Edial in 1736. The town is home to the smallest park (opened to commemorate the marriage of the Prince of Wales in 1863) in the UK, Prince's Park, which is located next to Christ Church on the junction of Farewell Lane and Church Road. The town expanded in the nineteenth century around the coal mining industry.

Areas of Burntwood are Boney Hay, Chase Terrace, Chasetown, Gorstey Lea and Burntwood Green. Nearby places are Brownhills, Cannock, Cannock Wood, Norton Canes, Gentleshaw, Pipehill, Muckley Corner, Hammerwich and Lichfield.

In July 2009 a Burntwood man, Terry Herbert, discovered a hoard of Saxon treasure with a metal detector in a field in the adjoining village of Hammerwich. Known as the Staffordshire Hoard, it is the largest hoard of Anglo-Saxon gold yet found.

Transport
Burntwood - along with Chasetown - has bus connections 60, 61 and 62 to Cannock, Rugeley and Lichfield operated by D&G Bus Chaserider. National Express West Midlands operate service 8 to Lichfield also linking Brownhills and Walsall.
The 937 service, which runs to Birmingham, is an extension from the usual terminus of Brownhills West and runs only at around 6am and runs back to Burntwood at 6pm weekdays.

Arriva Midlands was the former operator of most bus routes around Burntwood before being taken over by D&G Bus in January 2021, now operating under Chaserider which is a subsidiary of D&G. 

There are no railway connections in Burntwood. The nearest railway stations are Lichfield, Hednesford and Cannock, of which Lichfield is the closest.

Burntwood was served by the South Staffordshire Line which had a station in Hammerwich. There were many mineral lines in Burntwood which connected to Chasewater collieries as well as Angelsea Sidings. There is a heritage railway called the Chasewater Railway which is nearby with stops at Chasetown (Church Street) and Chasewater Heaths. In 2015, Lichfield District Council released a transport plan for Burntwood mentioning that if the line reopens to passenger services, there could be a chance of a new station to serve the town.

Ring Road near the town centre, as the name suggests, was intended to form part of the ring road around the town centre, a function superseded by the A5190.

Education

Nursery schools
  Abacus Early Learners
  Busy Bees at St Matthew's
  Little People Nursery
  Sunny Days Nursery
  Little Owls Nursery
  Oakbridge Little Learners

Primary schools
  Boney Hay Primary Academy (previously Boney Hay Community Primary School) 
  Chase Terrace Primary School
  Chasetown Community School
  Fulfen Primary School
  Highfields Primary School
  Holly Grove Primary School
  Ridgeway Primary School
  Springhill Primary School
  St Joseph and St Theresa Catholic Primary School

Secondary schools
 Chase Terrace Academy (previously Chase Terrace Technology College, before that Chase Terrace High School)
 Erasmus Darwin Academy (previously Chasetown Specialist Sports College, before that Chasetown High School)

Both high schools fell victim to arson attacks in 2002. Most of Chase Terrace was destroyed in August 2002. While Chasetown Specialist Sports College lost its gym facility in December 2002. Both buildings have been rebuilt and refurbished.

Special education
  Maple Hayes Hall School

Notable people 

 Dalian Atkinson Ex Aston Villa Footballer
 Francis Barber, 1742-1801 Samuel Johnson's manservant and assistant, who set up a school here.
 Kim Betts (born 1971) gymnast and body builder known as Lightning in Gladiators
 Jon Brookes (1969-2013) former drummer from The Charlatans
 Gary Cahill professional footballer with Aston Villa, Bolton Wanderers, Chelsea and England.
 Computerchemist (born 1964) multi-instrumentalist musician
 John Cornwall (c.1366–1414) an English soldier, politician and landowner;  in 1417, when sued for £20, gave his residence as Abnalls in Burntwood
 Jimmy Hill (born 1989) – English radio, television, and Internet personality
 Sonia Lannaman (born 1956) a British former 100 metres athlete, bronze medallist at the 1980 Summer Olympics
 Paul Manning MBE (born 1974) a former English professional track and road bicycle racer
 Kid Rad (born 1990) a British music artist, record producer and entrepreneur
 William Raynes (1871–1966) a British politician, MP for Derby 1923–4, alderman and Mayor of Derby
 Chris Slater (born 1984) – English footballer
 Stephen Sutton MBE (1994–2014) blogger for his blog Stephen's Story and charity activist for the Teenage Cancer Trust
 Gary J. Tunnicliffe (born 1968) a British special make-up effects designer, writer and director
 Alan Wiley (born 1960) a former English football referee

See also
Listed buildings in Burntwood

References

 
Towns in Staffordshire
Civil parishes in Staffordshire